Tech Advisor, previously known as PC Advisor, is a consumer tech website and digital magazine published by Foundry, a subsidiary of IDG Inc, which also produces Macworld, PCWorld and TechHive. IDG Inc was acquired by Blackstone in 2021.

Tech Advisor
In June 2017 PC Advisor was rebranded Tech Advisor, which continues to operate as both a website and monthly digital magazine focused on consumer and small business technology buying advice. 

On 24 August 2020 a formal announcement was made that the Tech Advisor forums would close permanently on Wednesday 2 September 2020.

In April 2021, Tech Advisor moved from a UK ccTLD (.co.uk) to a gTLD (.com) domain, focused primarily on smartphones, tablets, laptops and wearables, but also covering smart home and appliances, entertainment, audio and gaming, tech accessories, security, software and services.

In February 2022, Tech Advisor publisher IDG Communications was formally renamed Foundry.

PC Advisor

PC Advisor magazine offered advice on various aspects of PCs, related items such as digital photography, the internet, security and smartphones, and other personal-technology products and services. 

PC Advisor was the UK & Ireland edition of IDG's PCWorld. (Another discontinued magazine called Personal Computer World and a PC World retailer – neither related to the PCWorld magazine – already existed in the UK.)

PC Advisor's slogan was "Expert Advice You Can Trust".

Each month PC Advisor ran tests on various areas of the IT world from new pre-built desktop computers and laptops, LCD displays, graphics cards, motherboards, PDAs, wireless network routers, printers and many more. The magazine also included many reviews from products across the IT board including phones and accessories, cameras, and software from a wide range of vendors.

Each issue of the magazine featured a cover disc - either a DVD or a CD. The discs contained full-version commercial software products, as well as commercial software demos. In 2010 PC Advisor also became one of the first UK ESD (electronic software delivery) vendors of Microsoft's Windows 7 and Office 2010 products.

PC Advisors website hosted one of Europe's largest online communities with its tech forums and was considered one of the most popular technology magazine websites.

History
The print publication first appeared on UK news-stands in August 1995 with an October cover date. The website was launched in 1996.

In 2007, PC Advisor print magazine had an audited rate base of 65,160 readers (ABC audit: Jan-Dec 06) and a claimed 195,480 readers.

PC Advisor's editorial team routinely recommended best-in-class hardware and software products, while the PC Advisor Awards ran annually, with awards chosen by a combination of the editorial team and readers. In 2009 it also ran a UK Broadband Survey in association with Broadband Genie, and published Home Broadband Surveys annually.

In 1997, PC Advisor was given an official seal of Approval by the British Association of Criminal Experts. It achieved a '3-star' rating in three different categories, which is the highest level of rating for a non-forensic and expert publication. The magazine received 3 stars in each of the following categories; Academic Opinion, use as a Reference Source and use of Plain English.

The editorial team behind PC Advisor was awarded Content Team of the Year in the 2014 British Media Awards.

In 2016 PC Advisor was recognised as the UK's most popular tech website by Hitwise.

PC Advisor ran for 264 issues, with the last being July 2017.

See also
Computer Shopper
PC Format
PC Plus
PC Pro
Personal Computer World

References

External links

1995 establishments in the United Kingdom
2017 disestablishments in the United Kingdom
Defunct computer magazines published in the United Kingdom
Home computer magazines
Magazines established in 1995
Magazines disestablished in 2017
Monthly magazines published in the United Kingdom